RoboCop Versus The Terminator is a video game released for a number of platforms and is based on the RoboCop and Terminator franchises, two characters from the films are portrayed by Arnold Schwarzenegger from 1984's The Terminator and Peter Weller from 1987's RoboCop and the 1990 sequel, although both actors did not reprise their roles in this game, the likeness of the characters were used instead.

The Mega Drive/Genesis version, which was the original lead development of the game and was programmed by Virgin Games USA making use of David Perry's Mega Drive/Genesis engine, is loosely based on the 1992 four-issue comic book mini-series of the same name.

Synopsis

Mega Drive/Genesis version
Set a few years after RoboCop's invention, the story involves SAC-NORAD contracting Cyberdyne Systems on building Skynet. Cyberdyne used RoboCop's technology in creating Skynet. When activated, Skynet becomes self-aware and launches a war against mankind. In the future, Skynet sends several Terminators back to the past to cripple the Resistance. After destroying one of the Terminators, RoboCop proceeds to Delta City, where he confronts RoboCain.

After RoboCain was destroyed, RoboCop battles his way to the OCP building, where he defeats all the Terminators. After defeating an ED-209 unit reprogrammed by the Terminators, RoboCop plugs himself into a console. Unbeknownst to him, RoboCop gave Skynet information it can use. This ends up with RoboCop falling into a trap. In the future, RoboCop assembles himself, where he battled in the Terminator-infested future and destroyed Skynet.

SNES version
In the future, human soldiers of John Connor's resistance force against the machines are fighting a losing war against Skynet and its robot forces. Discovering that one of the foundation technologies for Skynet is the cybernetics technology used in the creation of cyborg police officer RoboCop, Flo, a resistance soldier, is sent back in time to destroy RoboCop and stop Skynet from being built. However, Skynet learns of the time travel attempt and sends Terminators to stop Flo. RoboCop soon meets up with Flo and must engage in battle against Terminators, the forces of OCP and several obstacles.

Upon discovering one of the Terminators has infiltrated the OCP building, RoboCop plugs himself into a console to reprogram the security, only to fall into a trap and be digitized. After his body is disassembled and used for building Skynet, RoboCop watches Skynet come to power before using his digitized mind to seize control of an abandoned robotics factory, rebuild himself, and begin to destroy Skynet in the future. He successfully destroys the Skynet CPU and prevails, and turns his sights to helping humanity rebuild from the devastation.

NES version
An evil copy of RoboCop and the Terminators went back in time to kill not only John, but also Alex Murphy, the RoboCop, himself. The real RoboCop learns about this from Flo, a resistance soldier from the future, and now he has to stop both the Terminators, Skynet, and his copy, before it's too late.

This version was finished but never released.

Reception 

Electronic Gaming Monthlys team of five reviewers gave the Super NES version a 5.8 out of 10. Mike Weigand, who gave it a 5, commented: "The comic book-esque cinema sequences are innovative and new, but the intensity isn't there". EGM gave the Game Gear version a 6.8 out of 10, with Weigand saying that it "holds up pretty well", though he commented that it suffers from slowdown, breakup, and difficulty which is slightly too high.  The Genesis version was awarded Bloodiest Game of 1993 by Electronic Gaming Monthly.

References

External links

RoboCop Versus The Terminator review

1993 video games
Run and gun games
Adaptations of works by Frank Miller
Cancelled Nintendo Entertainment System games
Crossover video games
Cyberpunk video games
Game Boy games
Game Gear games
Video games based on RoboCop
Sega Genesis games
Master System games
Shooter video games
Super Nintendo Entertainment System games
Terminator (franchise) video games
Video games about police officers
Video games based on Dark Horse Comics
Video games scored by Mark Cooksey
Video games scored by Sam Powell
Video games scored by Tommy Tallarico
Video games set in Detroit
Virgin Interactive games
Single-player video games
Interplay Entertainment games
Video games developed in the United States
Video games developed in the United Kingdom
NMS Software games